The 2012 European Fencing Championships was the 25th edition and held in Legnano, Italy. The event took place from June 15–20, 2012.

Schedule

Medal summary

Men's events

Women's events

Medal table

Results overview

Men

Foil individual

Épée individual

Sabre individual

Foil team

Épée team

Sabre team

Women

Foil individual

Épée individual

Sabre individual

Foil team

Épée team

Sabre team

References

External links
Official site
Eurofencing Site

2012
European Fencing Championships
International fencing competitions hosted by Italy
European Fencing Championships